CJB may refer to:

Canadian Journal of Bioethics
Cheongju Broadcasting
Coimbatore International Airport, IATA code CJB
Communist Youth Movement (Netherlands)
Complete Jewish Bible
Criminal Justice Bill, United Kingdom, passed into law as the Criminal Justice Act 1994